Dick or Richard Pope may refer to:
Dick Pope Sr. (1900–1988), founder of Cypress Gardens in Winter Haven, Florida; Waterskiing Hall of Fame inductee
Dick Pope Jr. (1930–2007), Waterskiing Hall of Fame inductee
Dick Pope (cinematographer) (born 1947), British cinematographer
Richard Shackleton Pope (1793–1884), architect
Richard Pope (politician) (born 1962), American perennial candidate